Captain Herbert Frank Stacey Drewitt  (25 March 1895 – 4 January 1927) was a New Zealand World War I flying ace credited with seven aerial victories. He was one of the few Royal Army aces that used French-built Spads as his weapon.

World War I service
Drewitt, a native of Christchurch, New Zealand, served originally in 23 Squadron. For his first kill, he used a Spad VII to shoot a German observation plane down in flames on 17 October 1917. Ten days later, he sent an Albatros D.V down out of control. He repeated the feat on 24 January 1918. On 11 March 1918, he switched mounts to a Spad XIII to defeat an observation plane. The following day saw him back in his Spad VII, as he destroyed an Albatros D.V. On both 15 and 16 March, he destroyed an enemy reconnaissance plane. Drewitt moved on to fly a Sopwith Dolphin for 79 Squadron, but never scored again.

Postwar
Drewitt died of illness in England on 5 January 1927.

Honors and awards

Military Cross (MC)

2nd Lt. (T./Capt.) Herbert Frank Stacey Drewitt, R.F.C., Spec. Res.
   
"For conspicuous gallantry and devotion to duty. He, with another pilot, persistently attacked a large body of hostile cavalry, with the result that great confusion was caused, many casualties inflicted, and the horses stampeded in all directions. On a later occasion he engaged with machine-gun fire from a low altitude two hostile field batteries which were shelling our infantry. He has destroyed in all six enemy machines and has brought down out of control six others. He has displayed exceptional skill and gallantry". (Supplement to the London Gazette, 22 June 1918) (30761/7408)

Sources of information

References
SPAD XII/XIII aces of World War I. Jon Guttman. Osprey Publishing, 2002. , 9781841763163.

1895 births
1927 deaths
Royal Flying Corps officers
People from Christchurch
New Zealand World War I flying aces
New Zealand recipients of the Air Force Cross (United Kingdom)
New Zealand recipients of the Military Cross